Uxío Adrián Marcos Nores (born 11 January 1993) is a Spanish footballer who plays for CCD Cerceda as a central defender.

Club career
Born in Ourense, Galicia, Uxío was a youth product of local Deportivo de La Coruña. He made his debuts as a senior with the reserves, representing the side in both the third and fourth divisions.

Uxío made his official debut for the Galicians' first team on 8 September 2013, starting in a 0–1 home loss against Real Murcia. He left Dépor in June of the following year.

In August 2014 Uxío joined another reserve team, Córdoba CF B also in the third division.

References

External links

1993 births
Living people
Spanish footballers
Footballers from Ourense
Association football defenders
Segunda División players
Segunda División B players
Tercera División players
Deportivo Fabril players
Deportivo de La Coruña players
Córdoba CF B players
Spain youth international footballers
Atlético Astorga FC players
La Roda CF players